Jamtsyn Davaajav (28 June 1953 – 2000) was a Mongolian welterweight wrestler. He competed at the 1976 Olympics in Greco-Roman and at the 1980 Olympics in freestyle wrestling and won a silver medal in 1980. In freestyle wrestling he also won a bronze medal at the 1978 Asian Games and placed fourth at the 1977 and 1979 world championships.

References

External links
 

1953 births
2000 deaths
People from Bulgan Province
Wrestlers at the 1976 Summer Olympics
Wrestlers at the 1980 Summer Olympics
Mongolian male sport wrestlers
Olympic wrestlers of Mongolia
Olympic silver medalists for Mongolia
Olympic medalists in wrestling
Medalists at the 1980 Summer Olympics
Asian Games medalists in wrestling
Wrestlers at the 1978 Asian Games
Asian Games bronze medalists for Mongolia
Medalists at the 1978 Asian Games
Universiade medalists in wrestling
Universiade bronze medalists for Mongolia
Medalists at the 1977 Summer Universiade
20th-century Mongolian people